The 33rd Infantry Regiment was an American unit stationed in the Panama Canal Zone and Caribbean from 1916-56. Though providing troops for various other American military formations, the regiment had no battle honors of its own.

History
Though other American regiments in the War of 1812 and American Civil War (33d Infantry Regiment, United States Colored Troops) formed from the 1st South Carolina Colored Infantry on 8 February 1864-disbanded 31 January 1866) had the designation of 33d Infantry, they have no lineage with the most recent 33d Infantry Regiment.

The 33d Infantry was activated on 6 July 1916 in accordance with War Department General Orders Number 22 dated 30 June 1916 that ordered seven new regiments to be organized; four in the Continental United States, one in the Philippine Islands (31st Infantry Regiment), one in Hawaii (32d Infantry Regiment), and one (the 33d Infantry) in the Canal Zone.

Chronicled by J. Fisher/Fort Clayton C.Z. on his six-foot panorama photo of the first assembly of the full regiment photographed November 1920.

"In 1916, when the whole of Europe was engaged in the great war, the United States Congress enacted a law increasing our armed forces. On [sic] of the results of this act of congress was the organization of the 33d infantry which was formed in the Canal Zone July 6, 1916, and has remained on duty here ever since. The enlisted personnel of the regiment was originally drawn from the 5th and 10th infantry stationed at Camps Empire and Otis. During the construction days both camps were occupied by troops after being vacated by civilians. Major General Charles H. Muir was the first regiment commander. Headquarters, machine gun, supply companies, and companies A,B,C,D,E, and F were organized at Camp Empire. Companies G,H,I,J,K,L, and M were organized at Camp Otis. The band section was organized at Fort Jay, N.Y. During the first four years of  existence, the 33d. infantry was distributed by battalions, and detachments, throughout the canal zone and the Republic of Panama. During the World War, it guarded Gatun Locks, the dam and spillway, the Monte Lirio and Mindi Bridges, the Chagres River Bridge at Gamboa, the Pedro Miguel and Miraflores locks, pier 18 and the dry dock at Balboa. During the period from 1916 to 1920, the regiment was engaged in exploring and charting the jungles of Panama.

In November, 1920, the young regiment assembled as a unit for the first time at Fort Clayton Canal Zone. The new post was named in honor of Colonel Bertram Tracy Clayton, who was killed in action in France May 30, 1918.

In 1941 the regiment was transferred from the Panama Canal Department to the Caribbean Defense Command. On 6 September 1941, the 1st Battalion was sent to Trinidad, with elements of the 1st Battalion later transferring to Surinam to guard bauxite mines, protect the Dutch government in exile, and watch the border of Vichy French Guiana. The 2d and 3d Battalions later arrived at Fort Read in Trinidad. The 1st Battalion was withdrawn from Surinam in June 1943 and moved to Aruba.

In March 1944 the regiment departed Trinidad arriving in New York in 1944, the first time the regimental colors arrived on Continental American soil. The regiment was assigned to Camp Claiborne Louisiana and assigned to the Fourth United States Army. Many of the regiment volunteered for Merrill's Marauders and were sent to Burma as the 2d Battalion 5307th Composite Unit (Provisional). The regiment was inactivated on 26 June 1944.

The 33d Infantry was reactivated at Fort Clayton in February 1946, inactivated again in September 1948 at Fort Gulick, then reactivated at Fort Kobbe, Canal Zone. During the Korean War the 3d Battalion of the 33d was transferred to the 65th Infantry Regiment for war service.

The 33d Infantry became part of the Americal Division in the Canal Zone on 2 December 1954, with the regiment being inactivated again on 26 May 1956, the assets of the unit being used to reactivate the 20th Infantry Regiment.

Lineage
Constituted 1 July 1916 in the Regular Army as the 33rd Infantry. Organized 5–7 July 1916 in the Canal Zone by the transfer of personnel from the 5th and 10th Infantry Regiments at Empire, and Camp Otis, Canal Zone. Inactivated 26 June 1944 at Camp Claiborne, Louisiana.Activated 1 February 1946 at Fort Clayton, Canal Zone. Inactivated 1 September 1948 at Fort Clayton. Activated 4 January 1950 at Fort Kobbe, Canal Zone. Inactivated 26 May 1956 at Fort Kobbe.

Distinctive unit insignia
 Description
A Silver color metal and enamel device  in height overall consisting of a shield blazoned: Argent, a pile cottised Azure, charged with a sword bayonet fesswise of the field. Attached below and to the sides of the shield a Silver scroll inscribed “RIDENTES VENIMUS” in Blue letters.
 Symbolism
This Regiment was organized in the Canal Zone in 1916, and served there during World War I guarding the canal. This is symbolized by the cotises of Infantry blue on each side of a pile to represent the canal. The motto translates to “Smiling We Come.”
Background
The distinctive unit insignia was approved on 8 January 1924.

Coat of arms

Blazon
 Shield
Argent, a pile cottised Azure, charged with a sword bayonet fesswise of the field.
 Crest
None.
Motto RIDENTES VENIMUS (Smiling We Come)

Symbolism
 Shield
This Regiment was organized in the Canal Zone in 1916, and served there during World War I guarding the canal. This is symbolized by the cotises of Infantry blue on each side of a pile to represent the canal.
 Crest
None.

Background
The coat of arms was approved on 2 March 1921.

Notes
 

 history.army.mil

0033
Military units and formations established in 1916
1916 establishments in the United States
Military units and formations disestablished in 1956